Batoprazine is a drug of the phenylpiperazine class which has been described as a serenic or antiaggressive agent. It acts as a 5-HT1A and 5-HT1B receptor agonist. It is closely related to eltoprazine, fluprazine, and naphthylpiperazine, of which possess similar actions and effects.

See also 
 Phenylpiperazine

References 

N-(2-methoxyphenyl)piperazines
Serotonin receptor agonists
Coumarin drugs